? is the ninth album by the Argentine rock band Bersuit Vergarabat.  It was recorded from July to October 2007, and was released on 18 December 2007 by Pussyfoot Records.

Track listing

Personnel 
Gustavo E. Cordera – lead vocals
Alberto Verenzuela – guitar, vocals
Oscar Humberto Righi – guitar
Carlos E. Martín – drums
Rene Isel Céspedes – bass, backing vocals
Daniel Suárez – backing vocals
Germán Sbarbatti – backing vocals
Juan Subirá – keyboards

References

2007 albums
Bersuit Vergarabat albums
Universal Music Group albums
Spanish-language albums